Kalle Hult (born May 27, 1995) is a Swedish ice hockey player. He is currently playing with HV71 of the Swedish Hockey League (SHL).

Hult made his Swedish Hockey League debut playing with HV71 during the 2014–15 SHL season.

References

External links

1995 births
Living people
HV71 players
Swedish ice hockey forwards
People from Vänersborg Municipality
Sportspeople from Västra Götaland County